Daill Loch  is an impounding reservoir located  west north west of Lochgilphead and  south of the Crinan Canal. It is one of a number of lochs supplying water to the canal.

See also
 List of reservoirs and dams in the United Kingdom

Sources
"Argyll and Bute Council Reservoirs Act 1975 Public Register"

Reservoirs in Argyll and Bute